is an upcoming professional wrestling event promoted by World Wonder Ring Stardom. The event will take place on April 23, 2023, in Yokohama at the Yokohama Arena.

Production

Background 
On December 29, 2022, during Dream Queendom 2, Stardom announced that on April 23, 2023, at the Yokohama Arena, for the first time, All Star Grand Queendom will take place. The event will take place 30 years after All Japan Women's Pro-Wrestling (AJW) All-Star Dream Slam, which is still considered one of the best wrestling events of all time.

Storylines 
The show features professional wrestling matches that result from scripted storylines, where wrestlers portray villains, heroes, or less distinguishable characters in the scripted events that build tension and culminate in a wrestling match or series of matches.

On February 10, 2023, Himeka announced her retirement from professional wrestling. She underwent a "retirement road" series of matches ever since and expressed her wish of facing her long time MaiHime tag team partner Maika as her last-ever opponent in a Stardom match.

On March 8, 2023, Kairi announced that she will take part into the event's card alongside a mystery partner.

Matches

Notes

References

External links
Page Stardom World

2023 in professional wrestling
World Wonder Ring Stardom shows
Women's professional wrestling shows
World Wonder Ring Stardom
Events in Yokohama
Professional wrestling in Yokohama